Hurdman is a station on Ottawa's O-Train Confederation Line, and bus rapid transit (BRT) system, transitway.

Location

The station is located just southeast of Hurdman Bridge where Highway 417 crosses the Rideau River. It is also located near the intersection of Industrial Avenue and Riverside Drive/Vanier Parkway.

There are connections from Hurdman station to the nearby neighbourhood of Riverview to the east with a bus-only road connecting to Alta Vista Drive. There are also connections for bicycle users, as Hurdman station is located very closely to the Rideau River bicycle path.

The station and nearby landmarks Hurdman Park, Hurdman Road, and Hurdman Bridge are named for the early settlers of the region. The station featured a small convenience store which closed with the original station. The site is relatively isolated, being almost completely surrounded by protected green space, with a few high-rise buildings on adjacent Riverside Drive. To the immediate south are two large artificial hills covering a former city landfill.

Transitway

Hurdman station was opened in 1983 as part of the first phase of Ottawa's bus rapid transitway. It was one of the transitway's busiest stations. Previously, it was the station where the main transitway route from downtown to the west branched off in two directions: one to the east toward Orléans and the other toward South Ottawa. Connexion routes serving Kanata and Barrhaven used to have Hurdman station as the downtown terminus before September 2013.   

The original station was closed in September 2015 and was replaced with a temporary station for the duration of construction of the O-Train's Confederation Line.  Demolition of the old station structure was completed in November 2015.

On September 3rd, 2017, Route 40 (originally route 114) was extended to start/end at Hurdman station during peak hours like how what is now route 74 was extended from Nepean Woods to start/end Riverview station on July 19th, 2014. However, on June 20th, 2021, route 40 was shortened to start/end at Greenboro station during peak hours like it originally did as route 114.

It fully reopened on September 14, 2019, when Confederation Line service began. It remains the terminus of the transitway to South Ottawa, as well as serving local lines.

Layout

Hurdman is an elevated side platform station; a large concourse is located at ground level and contains the ticket barrier, as well as fare-paid zone access to the Transitway terminal loop, allowing transfer between buses and the train without needing to show a transfer. Additional stairwells at the western end of the platforms give direct access to the Transitway terminal.

The station's artwork, Coordinated Movement by Jill Anholt, is a curved sculpture suspended along the station access opposite the ticket barrier.

Service

The following routes serve Hurdman station as of October 6 2019:

Notes:
 There is a Stop F located at the other end of the bus loop which is currently only used for regional transit lines.

References

External links
OC Transpo area map
Hurdman Station: Area Redevelopment Study

Confederation Line stations
1983 establishments in Ontario
2019 establishments in Ontario
Railway stations in Canada opened in 2019
Transitway (Ottawa) stations